Zhongli is a railway station in Taoyuan, Taiwan served by Taiwan Railways Administration. It is the third-busiest station in Taiwan's rail network. It is also a planned terminus for Taoyuan Airport MRT of the Taoyuan Metro, scheduled for completion in 2028.

Around the station
 Army Academy R.O.C.
 Chien Hsin University of Science and Technology
 Chung Yuan Christian University
 Ching Yun Commercial Center
 Laojie River (about 800 meters west of the station)
 Zhongli Arts Hall
 Zhongli Tourist Night Market (about 1500 meters west of the station)
 Zhongping Commercial District (next to the station)
 Zhongping Road Story House (about 300 meters north-west of the station)
 Zhongzheng Park (about 600 meters north of the station)

See also
 List of railway stations in Taiwan

References

1893 establishments in Taiwan
Railway stations in Taoyuan City
Railway stations opened in 1893
Railway stations served by Taiwan Railways Administration